This is a list of the principal areas of Wales, ordered by their highest points.

Notes
The highest points in the principal areas of both Torfaen and Rhondda Cynon Taf are not summits but locations high on hills, the summits of which are just across the boundary in neighbouring principal areas.

 

Highest point
Principal areas
Welsh principal areas